Jane Shelton Livingston (born 12 February 1944) is an American art curator. She is the author and co-author of numerous books and catalogs.

Life and work
Livingston was born in Upland, California.

From 1967 to 1975, she was curator of 20th-century art at the Los Angeles County Museum of Art. She was editor of the Richard Diebenkorn Catalogue Raisonné and now works as an independent curator.

In 1975 she became associate director and chief curator at the Corcoran Gallery of Art, but resigned in 1989, prompted by the Corcoran's cancellation of a show of work by photographer Robert Mapplethorpe. Livingston had been on sabbatical, writing a book under a Guggenheim Fellowship when the exhibition was cancelled; when she returned, she made it clear that she would not have cancelled the show. Livingston had arranged the installation, which was financed in part by the National Endowment for the Arts (NEA).

She is known for organizing a major museum exhibition of Chicano art, and, together with Marcia Tucker, the first major museum exhibition of Bruce Nauman. Other exhibitions include her show of National Geographic, "illustrative" photography. She and curator John Beardsley also curated an exhibition of black outsider artists in 1982. This show "marked an explosion of interest in the work of African American artists." Livingston curated a show of John Alexander's works at the Smithsonian American Art Museum in 2008.

Livingston's work on The Art of Richard Diebenkorn (1997) helped produce a book that collected the most important works of Richard Diebenkorn, who had been under-represented in publishing. The catalogue raisonné she compiled on the artist appeared in 2016.

Publications

References

1944 births
Living people
People from Upland, California
American art curators
American women curators
21st-century American women